Rainbow Lake is a hamlet in Franklin County, New York, United States. Rainbow Lake has a post office with ZIP code 12976, which opened on July 8, 1884.

References

 Hamlets in Franklin County, New York
 Hamlets in New York (state)